The Massachusetts Avenue Historic District in Worcester, Massachusetts is a  historic district that was listed on the National Register of Historic Places in 1971.  At that time, it included 11 contributing buildings and one other contributing site.

This district, the Montvale Historic District, and the Hammond Heights Historic District, are northwest of the Worcester core area and are elaborate Victorian districts.  They were created for upper class housing through the subdivision of many farms and estates, when southern and eastern sections of Worcester were filling up with three-decker working class housing.

It includes a Federal style former courthouse that was converted, during 1801–03, into a Federal style house.  It includes houses of the Arts and Crafts movement, Prairie style and Bungalow style.

See also
National Register of Historic Places listings in northwestern Worcester, Massachusetts
National Register of Historic Places listings in Worcester County, Massachusetts

References

Queen Anne architecture in Massachusetts
Colonial Revival architecture in Massachusetts
Historic districts in Worcester County, Massachusetts
Houses in Worcester, Massachusetts
National Register of Historic Places in Worcester, Massachusetts
Neighborhoods in Worcester, Massachusetts
Historic districts on the National Register of Historic Places in Massachusetts
1971 establishments in Massachusetts